First Rhapsody is a piece for piano solo by the English composer John Ireland.

A performance takes about 12 minutes.

The John Ireland Trust records the year of composition as 1905 and the key as C-sharp minor. Allmusic (a derivative source), says 190506 and C-sharp major. The premiere recording (Mark Bebbington, 2010) says 1906 and C-sharp major.

According to Andrew Achenbach, writing in Gramophone Awards Issue 2010, the work had "languished undiscovered in the papers of Bruce Phillips (chairman of the John Ireland Trust). The engraver’s markings on the manuscript suggest that this ripely romantic outpouring was at one stage intended for publication, but the self-critical composer evidently had second thoughts". Mark Kennedy, writing in the Sunday Telegraph (August 2010), remarked, "why Ireland withheld it for so long isn’t evident from the quality of the music".

Footnotes

References 

Solo piano pieces by John Ireland
1906 compositions
Ireland, John
Compositions in C-sharp major